Lophogallus is a genus of prehistoric phasianid which is known from the Oshin Formation during the middle Miocene. It is known from the holotype humerus and a referred partial femur, both from the type locality of Naran Bulak, Mongolia. It was described by N. V. Zelenkov and E. N. Kurochkin in 2010, and the type species is Lophogallus naranbulakensis.

References

Bird genera
Phasianidae
Neogene birds of Asia
Fossil taxa described in 2010